Following is a list of Korean cuisine restaurants:

 Beastro, Portland, Oregon, U.S.
 Bonchon Chicken, South Korea and United States
 Cote
 Cupbop, United States and Indonesia
 Han Oak, Portland, Oregon
 Joule, Seattle
 Kim Jong Grillin', Portland, Oregon
 Kyochon, South Korea
 Pelicana Chicken, South Korea
 Pyongyang, international
 Revelry, Portland, Oregon
 SMT House, South Korea
 Toki, Portland, Oregon

Restaurants
 
Lists of ethnic restaurants